A sala ( (IAST: śālā),), also known as a Sala Thai, is an open pavilion, used as a meeting place and to give people shade. With etymological roots in the Sanskrit sala, the word in Thai connotes buildings for specific purposes, such as sala klang ('provincial hall'). Most are open on all four sides. They are found throughout Thailand in Buddhist temple areas, or wats, although they can also be at other places. A person who builds a sala at a temple or in a public place gains religious merit. A sala located in a temple is called a salawat (ศาลาวัด). Some temples have large salas where laity can hear sermons or receive religious instruction. These are called sala kan parian (ศาลาการเปรียญ), meaning 'pavilion where monks learn for the Parian examination'. The city halls or offices of the province governors are called sala wa kan (ศาลาว่าการ, literally meaning 'government pavilion') or sala klang changwat (ศาลากลางจังหวัด, literally meaning a 'provincial main pavilion').

In Thailand, they have many purposes similar to the roadside pavilions of Asoka. In rural areas, travelers can use them to rest and reflect. These salas are called sala asai. One at the roadside is a sala rim thanon (ศาลาริมถนน) and may be used as a bus stop. If on a riverbank or canal at a landing-place for watercraft, they are called sala tha nam (ศาลาท่าน้ำ 'water pier pavilions').

Etymology 

The term "sala" earliest known mention is found in Atharvaveda, which is an Indian Hindu text written in sanskrit language, which has been dated to 1200 BC to 1000 BC. "Sala" in Atharvaveda and later in various Indian languages denotes "house" in a broad and generic sense, with meanings such as "stall" for cattle, "shed" for corn, room or house, etc. The owner or the head of the house is called the "sala-pati" in Atharvaveda. Term "sala" is a cognate of Hindi शाल, meaning hall, large room or shed.

With expansion of Indosphere cultural influence of Greater India, through transmission of Hinduism in Southeast Asia and the Silk Road transmission of Buddhism leading to Indianization of Southeast Asia through formation of non-Indian southeast Asian native Indianized kingdoms which adopted sanskritized language and other Indian elements such as the honorific titles, naming of people, naming of places, mottos of organisations and educational institutes as well as adoption of Indian architecture, martial arts, Indian music and dance, traditional Indian clothing, and Indian cuisine, a process which has also been aided by the ongoing historic expansion of Indian diaspora. During the pre-islamic and pre-colonial phase, through the Indianised Hindu-Buddhist kingdoms of southeast asia the usage of term "sala" and other sanskrit words of Indian origins then spread to various other nations within Indospehere including Thailand, Philippines, Indonesia, Singapore, Brunei, Cambodia, etc.

Salas outside Thailand

 Olbrich Botanical Gardens, Madison, Wisconsin, United States
 East–West Center, Honolulu, Hawaii, United States
 Ueno Zoological Gardens, Tokyo, Japan
 Parc du Denantou, Lausanne, Switzerland
 Kurpark, Bad Homburg v.d.H, Germany
 Westpark, Munich, Germany

See also
 Architecture of Thailand
 Ordination hall
 Zayat

References

External links

Elements and parts of Thai architecture
 East-West Center, A Commemorative Book by the Thai Students at the East-West Center on the Occasion of the Presentation of the Asia Pacific Community Building Award and Dedication of the Royal Sala Thai, Honolulu, East-west Center, 2008.

Hindu architecture
Architecture in Thailand
Traditional Thai architecture
National symbols of Thailand